Flavia Company (born 27 September 1963) writer and traveler. She develops her work either in Spanish and Catalan. She has a degree in Hispanic Philology, is a journalist, translator, teacher of creative writing and lecturer. She works in different genres (novel, short story, short story, essay and poetry). She also publishes children's literature. She lives in  Catalonia.

In June 2018, she embarked on a trip around the world that lasted four years. From that experience she wrote her book “I no longer need to be real”, which she signed with the name of Haru, one of her three heteronyms together with Andrea Mayo and Osamu.

She is one of the most unclassifiable voices in current literature and her work has been translated into English, French, Portuguese, Italian, Polish, German and Danish.

She collaborates in the newspapers La Vanguardia and Ara.

Fiction (in Spanish)

La planta carnívora. Editorial Comba, 2021. Firmado con heterónimo: Andrea Mayo
Dame placer. Editorial Comba, 2021.
Ya no necesito ser real. Catedral, 2020. Firmado con heterónimo: Haru
Magôkoro. Catedral, 2019.
Haru. Catedral, 2016.
Querida Nélida, reedición en Ediciones La Palma, Colección EME, 2016.
Que nadie te salve la vida. Lumen, 2012. (Editorial El Ateneo, 2020)
La isla de la última verdad. Lumen, 2011.
La mitad sombría. DVD Ediciones, 2006. (Editorial Evaristo, 2020)
Ni tú, ni yo, ni nadie. Ed. Muchnik, 2002.
Melalcor. Ed. Muchnik, 2000. 
Dame placer. Ed. Emecé, 1999. (Reedición en 2021, Editorial Comba)
Luz de hielo. Bassarai Ediciones, 1998.
Saurios en el asfalto. Ed. Muchnik, 1997.
Círculos en acíbar. Ed. Montesinos, 1992.
Fuga y contrapuntos. Ed. Montesinos, 1989.
Querida Nélida. Ed. Montesinos, 1988.

Fiction (in Catalan) 

 La planta carnívora. Ed. Proa (2021). Signed with heteronym: ANDREA MAYO
 Ja no necessito ser real. Univers Llibres, 2020. Signed with heteronym: HARU

Magôkoro. Catedral, 2019.
Haru. Catedral, 2016.
Que ningú no et salvi la vida. Ed. Proa, 2012.
L'illa de l'última veritat. Ed. Proa, 2010.
Negoci Rodó. Ed. Columna, 2005.
Melalcor. Edicions 62, 2000.
Ni tu, ni jo, ni ningú. Premio Documenta 1997. Edicions 62, 1998.
Llum de Gel. Edicions El Mèdol, 1996.

Short stories (in Spanish)

Pensamientos de Haru. Editorial Koan. (Aparición en octubre de 2022)
Teoría de la resta. Editorial Comanegra, 2022.
Por mis muertos. Páginas de Espuma, 2014.
Trastornos literarios. Ed. Páginas de Espuma, 2011. (Reedición revisada y con textos inéditos.)
Con la soga al cuello. Ed. Páginas de Espuma, 2009.
El apartamento. MobilBook/Salón Náutico, 2006.
Género de Punto. Ed. El Aleph, 2003.
Trastornos Literarios. Colección de microrrelatos aparecidos previamente en prensa. Ed. DeBolsillo, 2002.
 Dame placer. Mario Muchnik editor, 1999
Viajes subterráneos. Bassarai Ediciones, 1997.

Short stories (in Catalan)

Teoria de la resta. Editorial Comanegra, 2022.
Al teu rotllo. Ed. Cruïlla, 2015.
No em ratllis. Ed. Cruïlla, 2012.
L’apartament. MobilBook/Salón Náutico, 2006.
Viatges Subterranis. Ed. El Mèdol, 1993.

Poetic prose 

 Retrat de la Ràpita. En catalán. Con ilustraciones de la pintora Rosa Querol. Edición del Ayuntamiento de San Carlos de la Rápita, 1996.

Poetry 

 Yo significo algo. Stendhal Books, 2016.
 Volver antes que ir. En castellano. Eugenio Cano Editor, Madrid, 2012.

Children's literature

 Societat Kyoto. Ed. Cruïlla, 2019.
 El llibre de les preguntes. Ed. Cruïlla, 2016.
 Dóna-hi la volta. Ed. Cruïlla, 2016.
 Una gàbia, un tresor i unes sabatilles vermelles. Editorial La meva Arcàdia 2014.
 Els ambigú i el cas de la mòmia. Ed. Cruïlla. Col. El Vaixell de Vapor, 2014.
 Els Ambigú i el cas de l'estàtua. Ed. Cruïlla. Col. El Vaixell de Vapor, 2010.
 Un perill sota el mar. Ed. Cruïlla. Col. El Vaixell de Vapor, 2009.
 Estels Vermells. Ed. Cruïlla. Col. El Vaixell de Vapor, 2008.
 Gosigatades. Ed. Animallibres, 2007.
 L’espai desconegut. Ed. Cruïlla. Col. El Vaixell de Vapor, 2006.
 El missatge secret. Ed. Cruïlla. Col. El Vaixell de Vapor, 2004.
 L’illa animal. Ed. Cruïlla. Col. El Vaixell de Vapor, 2003.
 El llibre màgic. Ed. Cruïlla. Col. El Vaixell de Vapor, 2001.

Own work translated into other languages 

L'isola dell' ultima verità (La isla de la última verdad) Traducción al italiano, Italia. Edizioni E/O, 2013. Traducción de Stefania Ciminelli.
The island of last truth, Europa Editions, New York, 2012.
Com a corda no pescoço (Con la soga al cuello) Traducción al portugués, Brasil. Ed. Cubzac, 2011. Traducción de Luís Carlos Cabral.
Die Insel der letzten Wahrheit (La isla de la última verdad) Traducción al alemán, Ed.Berlin Verlag, 2011. Traducción de Kirsten Brandt.
A mitade sombria (La mitad sombría) Traducción al portugués, Brasil. Ed. Cubzac. Enero 2008. Traducción de Ana Lima Cecilio.
“Diario”, del libro de cuentos Género de Punto. Seleccionado para la antología “Crossing Barcelona”, al alemán, 2007. Ed. Sammlung Luchterland. Traducción de Hanna Grzimek.
Viajes subterráneos, cuentos. Traducción al polaco. 1999.
Ni tú ni yo ni nadie, traducción por la autora del catalán al castellano. Ed. El Aleph, 2003.
Dame Placer, traducción al holandés, Ed. De Geus, (2002).
Dá-me Prazer, traducción al portugués de Serafim Ferreira, Ed. Difel, 2001.
Donne-moi du plaisir, traducción al francés de Claude Bleton, Ed. Flammarion, 2001.
Luz de Hielo (novela; traducción por la autora al castellano de Llum de Gel,). Ed. Bassarai, 1998.
  (

See also
 Lists of writers

References

External links

Cuatro rostros de Hermes en la obra narrativa de Flavia Company (2006), tesis doctoral de Eva Gutiérrez Pardina.
Blog de Flavia Company.

1963 births
Living people
Argentine women novelists
People from Buenos Aires
Argentine emigrants to Spain
Spanish women writers